The Raid on Alexandria was carried out on 19 December 1941 by Italian Navy divers of the Decima Flottiglia MAS, who attacked and disabled two Royal Navy battleships in the harbour of Alexandria, Egypt, using manned torpedoes.

Background
On 3 December, the submarine  of the Italian Royal Navy (Regia Marina) under the command of lieutenant Junio Valerio Borghese left the naval base of La Spezia carrying three manned torpedoes, nicknamed maiali (pigs) by the Italians. At the island of Leros in the Aegean Sea, the submarine secretly picked up six crewmen for them: Luigi Durand de la Penne and Emilio Bianchi (maiale nº 221), Vincenzo Martellotta and Mario Marino (maiale nº 222), and Antonio Marceglia and Spartaco Schergat (maiale nº 223).

Raid

On 19 December, Scirè—at a depth of —released the manned torpedoes  from Alexandria commercial harbour, and they entered the naval base when the British opened their defenses to let three of their destroyers pass. There were many difficulties for de la Penne and his crewmate Emilio Bianchi. First, the engine of the torpedo stopped and the two frogmen had to manually push it; then Bianchi had to surface due to problems with the oxygen provider, so that de la Penne had to push the maiale alone to where  lay. There he successfully placed the limpet mine, just under the hull of the battleship. However, as they both had to surface, and as Bianchi was hurt, they were discovered and captured.

Questioned, both of them kept silent, and they were confined in a compartment aboard Valiant, below the water line, and coincidentally just over the place where the mine had been placed. Fifteen minutes before the explosion, de la Penne asked to meet with Valiants captain Charles Morgan and then told him of the imminent explosion but refused to give further information, so that he was returned to the compartment. When the mine exploded just beneath them, neither was severely injured by the blast, de la Penne only receiving a minor injury to the head from a ship chain.

Meanwhile, Marceglia and Schergat had attached their device five feet beneath the battleship 's keel as scheduled. They successfully left the harbour area at 04:30 am, and slipped through Alexandria posing as French sailors. They were captured two days later at Rosetta by the Egyptian police while awaiting rescue by Scirè and handed over to the British.

Martellotta and Marino searched in vain for an aircraft carrier purportedly moored at Alexandria, but after some time they decided to attack a large tanker, the 7,554 gross register ton Norwegian Sagona. Marino fixed the mine under the tanker's stern at 02:55. Both divers managed to land unmolested, but were eventually arrested at an Egyptian police checkpoint.

In the end, all the divers were made prisoners, though they succeeded in severely damaging both Queen Elizabeth and Valiant, disabling them for nine months and six months respectively. Eight members of Queen Elizabeth'''s crew were killed.Sagona lost her stern section and the destroyer , one of four alongside her refuelling, was badly damaged. Neither of the two capital ships sank but they were out of action for several months.Brown, David. p. 225.

Aftermath
This represented a dramatic change of fortunes against the Allies from the strategic point of view during the next six months. The Italian fleet had temporarily wrested naval supremacy in the east-central Mediterranean from the Royal Navy."Overnight, the sea had became an Axis lake. And the Italian Navy held dominating power." Schofield, Williams, and Carisella, P. J. (2004).  Frogmen: First Battles. Branden Books, p. 134. Sadkovich, p. 219Valiant was towed to Admiralty Floating Dock No. 5 on 21 December for temporary repairs and was under repair at Alexandria until April 1942 when she sailed to Durban. By August, she was operating with Force B off Africa in exercises for the defence of East Africa and Battle of Madagascar.Queen Elizabeth was in drydock at Alexandria for temporary repairs until late June, when she sailed for the United States for refit and repairs, which ended the following June. The refit was completed in Britain.Jervis was repaired and operational again by the end of January. Sagona was towed back to England and repairs were not completed until 1946.

In media
The attack is dramatised at the beginning of the film The Silent Enemy (1958). Another movie The Valiant (1962), is about the damage to HMS Valiant in Alexandria harbour. There is also a 1953 Italian movie (I sette dell'Orsa Maggiore) about the attack.

See also
 Lionel Crabb
 Operation Source

Notes

References

 "Sea Devils" by J. Valerio Borghese, translated into English by James Cleugh, with introduction by the United States Naval Institute 
 The Italian Navy in World War II by Marc'Antonio Bragadin, United States Naval Institute, Annapolis, 1957. 
 "The Black Prince and the Sea Devils: The Story of Valerio Borghese and the Elite Units of the Decima Mas", by Jack Greene and Alessandro Massignani, Cambridge, Massachusetts: Da Capo Press, 2004, 284 pages, hardcover. 
 
 
 
 The Italian Navy in World War II by Sadkovich, James, Greenwood Press, Westport, 1994. 
 "Frogmen: First Battles''" by William Schofield, P. J. Carisella & Adolph Caso, Branden Books, Boston, 2004.

External links
 "Principal Operations of the 10th Light Flotilla" – RegiaMarina.net  

Alexandria
Alexandria
Frogman operations
1941 in Egypt
Alexandria
Alexandria
Alexandria (1941)
Military history of Alexandria
20th-century military history of the United Kingdom
Alexandria
Maritime incidents in December 1941
December 1941 events
20th century in Alexandria